The Domain Highway is a highway in Tasmania, Australia. The highway acts as a link road connecting traffic between Hobart's two busiest highways; The Tasman Highway and the Brooker Highway while also bypassing the Hobart city centre. With recorded annual average daily traffic of 25,000, the single carriageway road is busier than some of Hobart's dual carriageway highways. Commencing at the Brooker Highway at Cornelian Bay and  heading southeast between the banks of the Derwent River and the Domain and Botanical Gardens. The highway ends at the Tasman Highway, on the western approach of the Tasman Bridge.

Exits
The entire highway is in the City of Hobart local government area.

See also 

 List of Highways in Hobart

References

Highways in Tasmania
Highways in Hobart